William Nelstrop (28 November 1801 - 10 September 1877) was an English miller and political figure. Hailing from Ackworth, Yorkshire, he began milling at the Nelstrop family farm before establishing the steam-powered Albion Mills on Lancashire Hill in the suburbs of Stockport in 1820. Nelstrops became a thriving producer of flour in the 19th century and is still a successful firm today. 
As a wealthy entrepreneur, Nelstrop became a major figure in Stockport, and became mayor of the town. He rejected a knighthood from Queen Victoria for helping suppress the  Anti-Corn Law Riots in the 1840s, expressing sympathy with the poor. He passed the family firm on, and it is in its fifth generation.

References

Millers
19th-century English businesspeople
1801 births
1877 deaths
People from Ackworth, West Yorkshire
Mayors of Stockport